KFTA/KNWA may refer to:

 KFTA-TV, a television station (channel 24 analog/27 digital) licensed to Fort Smith, Arkansas, United States
 KNWA-TV, a television station (channel 51) licensed to Rogers, Arkansas, United States